Who’s Afraid of Beowulf? is the second humorous-fantasy novel by popular British author Tom Holt, first published in the UK in 1988 by Macmillan Publishers.  Unlike Holt's other early books, this is not based on any particular opera or well-known mythic cycle.

Summary
When American archeologist Hildy Frederiksen investigates an ancient Viking burial ship in Scotland, she finds that the Viking heroes on board are still alive, even though centuries have passed. Now she must help them defeat the evil sorcerer king.

Reception

Publishers Weekly called it "(p)art slapstick, part fantasy (...and) all entertainment" and "unforced and inventive".

Kirkus Reviews found it to be "sprightly (and) well-plotted", and "grinworthy", but faulted Holt's portrayal of Hildy, stating that "(i)n neither speech nor deed is (she)a very convincing American".

References

External links
 

1988 British novels
English fantasy novels
British comedy novels
Novels set in Highland (council area)
Macmillan Publishers books
Novels by Tom Holt